Geispolsheim is a commune in the Bas-Rhin department in Grand Est in north-eastern France.

Geography
Geispolsheim is positioned  to the south of Strasbourg.

The newer settlement was known as 'Geispolsheim-Gare' (Geispolsheim-Station), and retains the name even though the station itself was demolished in 1992, while the original settlement is still unofficially referred to as 'Geispolsheim-Village'. The two parts of the little town are linked by the departmental road RD84.

Today included in the Strasbourg Eurométropole, Geispolsheim is well positioned for future expansion:  it already offers significant local employment and commercial opportunities in its industrial and artisanal zones.

Population

See also
 Communes of the Bas-Rhin department

References

Communes of Bas-Rhin
Bas-Rhin communes articles needing translation from French Wikipedia